Sammy Vidal (born 28 June 1996) is a French professional footballer who most recently played as a midfielder for Red Star.

Professional career
Vidal is a youth product of Paris FC, and spent his early career in the lower divisions of France before joining Red Star F.C. in the summer of 2018. He made his professional debut with Red Star in a 0–0 Ligue 2 tie with Clermont Foot on 19 October 2018.

In January 2019, he was loaned to Furiani until the end of the season.

In September 2019, he negotiated termination of his Red Star contract, having only played three games for the clubs. Vidal was without club until the end of May 2020, where he signed with Louhans-Cuiseaux FC.

Personal life
Born in France, Vidal is of Spanish and Algerian descent.

References

External links
 
 

Living people
1996 births
Footballers from Paris
French footballers
French people of Spanish descent
French sportspeople of Algerian descent
Association football midfielders
Ligue 2 players
Championnat National 2 players
Red Star F.C. players
AS Furiani-Agliani players